The St. Bonaventure Bonnies women's basketball team (formerly the St. Bonaventure Brown Squaws) is the women's basketball team that represents St. Bonaventure University in Allegany, New York. The team currently competes in the Atlantic 10 Conference. The Bonnies' head coach is Jim Crowley, who returned for a second stint with the team in March 2023.

Postseason

NCAA tournament results
The Bonnies have appeared in two NCAA Tournaments. Their combined record is 3–2.

NCAA tournament seeding history

NIT results
The Bonnies have appeared in four National Invitation Tournaments. Their combined record is 5–4.

Season-by-season record
As of the 2016–17 season, the Bonnies have a 572–587 record, with a 183–306 Atlantic-10 Conference record. It was a club sport at St. Bonaventure from 1959–1971. They have made the WNIT in 2009, 2010, 2011, and 2014, going to the Quarterfinals in 2009. They made the NCAA Tournament in 2012 and 2016, going to the Sweet 16 in 2012 and the Round of 32 in 2016.

Head coaching record

Broadcasting
WGWE/Little Valley, NY was the broadcast home of the team from 2014 until the station shut down in 2021. WGWE's morning host (Mike Smith from 2014 to 2016, and Chris Russell from 2016 to 2021) served as play-by-play voice throughout that time frame.

References

External links